In the mathematical field of knot theory, a quantum knot invariant or quantum invariant of a knot or link is a linear sum of colored Jones polynomial of surgery presentations of the knot complement.

List of invariants
Finite type invariant
Kontsevich invariant
Kashaev's invariant
Witten–Reshetikhin–Turaev invariant (Chern–Simons)
Invariant differential operator
Rozansky–Witten invariant
Vassiliev knot invariant
Dehn invariant
LMO invariant
Turaev–Viro invariant
Dijkgraaf–Witten invariant
Reshetikhin–Turaev invariant
Tau-invariant
I-Invariant
Klein J-invariant
Quantum isotopy invariant
Ermakov–Lewis invariant
Hermitian invariant
Goussarov–Habiro theory of finite-type invariant
Linear quantum invariant (orthogonal function invariant)
Murakami–Ohtsuki TQFT
Generalized Casson invariant
Casson-Walker invariant
Khovanov–Rozansky invariant
HOMFLY polynomial 
K-theory invariants
Atiyah–Patodi–Singer eta invariant
Link invariant
Casson invariant
Seiberg–Witten invariants
Gromov–Witten invariant
Arf invariant
Hopf invariant

See also
Invariant theory
Framed knot
Chern–Simons theory
Algebraic geometry
Seifert surface
Geometric invariant theory

References

Further reading

External links
 Quantum invariants of knots and 3-manifolds By Vladimir G. Turaev

Invariant theory
Knot theory